John Alexander Ferguson (15 December 1881 – 7 May 1969) was a New Zealand-born Australian lawyer, judge, book collector, and author. He is best known for writing the seven-volume Bibliography of Australia, a guide to books published prior to 1901 in and on the topic of Australia. He also practised labor law and had a career as a judge in the Industrial Commission of New South Wales.

Life and family
John A. Ferguson was born 15 December 1881 in Invercargill, New Zealand, to Rev. John Ferguson and Isabella, née Adie (1854–1929). The family moved in 1894 to Sydney, Australia, where Rev. John was pastor at St Steven's Church.

In 1907, John A. married Bessie Robertson (1882–1937).  They had four children, George Adie (1910–1998),
Margaret Douglas (1912–2000), lawyer John Bruce (1914–1989), and Colin Scott (b. 1919) who died in 1943 in a Bristol Beaufort bomber accident while training in the Royal Australian Air Force.

In 1945, John A. married Dorothy Johnston (1916–1995). They had two children, Diana (1947–2022) and Alexander Stuart (1948–).  At John A.'s death on 7 May 1969, the couple resided at 81 Clanville Rd., Roseville NSW.

Education
Ferguson received a B.A. in 1902 and an Ll.B. in 1905 from the University of Sydney.

Legal career

Ferguson joined the bar on 27 May 1905.  He specialized in labor law and appeared before the High Court of Australia and the Judicial Committee of the Privy Council.  In 1938, he was appointed a judge with the Industrial Commission of New South Wales, precursor to today's Industrial Relations Commission of New South Wales.  He was active with that body until 1951 and formally retired in 1952.

National Library of Australia

The Ferguson Collection of the National Library of Australia contains John A. Ferguson's extensive collections, including particular strengths in Australia and the Pacific Islands.

Honors and awards
Ferguson was made a fellow of the Royal Australian Historical Society in 1927. He received an honorary doctorate from the University of Sydney, on 29 April 1955. He was made OBE in 1957 and received a knighthood in 1961.

Papers

John A Ferguson's personal papers are archived in the National Library of Australia along with his collections mentioned above.

Selected bibliography

Bibliography (genre)

Legal articles

References

20th-century Australian judges
Australian librarians
Australian bibliographers
New Zealand emigrants to Australia
1881 births
1969 deaths
Australian book and manuscript collectors